Rachael Bella Zvagelsky (née Kneeland, born March 13, 1984) known professionally as Rachael Bella, is an American former actress.

Career
Bella is best known for her role as Becca Kotler in the movie The Ring. She has also appeared in other various movies and television shows, such as Law & Order: Special Victims Unit, Buffy the Vampire Slayer, Boston Public and Tru Calling and The Crucible.

She retired from acting in 2007.

Personal life
Bella married Edward Furlong on April 19, 2006. She gave birth to their son in September 2006. On July 8, 2009, Bella filed for divorce citing irreconcilable differences. She alleged in court documents that their son tested positive for cocaine, which led a judge to rule Furlong's visits had to be supervised. In May 2013, she obtained a restraining order against Furlong, alleging domestic violence. Furlong pleaded no contest.

She married Ron Zvagelsky on July 30, 2014. They have two children together.

Filmography

Film

Television

References

External links

1984 births
20th-century American actresses
21st-century American actresses
Actresses from South Dakota
American child actresses
American film actresses
American television actresses
Living people
People from Vermillion, South Dakota
People from Yankton County, South Dakota